Avivamiento Broadcasting Network (also known as ABN) is a Colombian local religious television channel, based in Bogotá. It is owned by the Centro Mundial de Avivamiento, a Christian congregation led by pastors Ricardo Rodríguez and María Patricia Patty Rodríguez. ABN started broadcasting 21 June 2001.

References

External links 
 Official site, includes live Windows Media stream 

Television networks in Colombia
Television channels and stations established in 2001
Television stations in Colombia
Evangelical television networks
Spanish-language television stations
Mass media in Bogotá